The 1992 NAIA Division II men's basketball tournament  was the tournament held by the NAIA to determine the national champion of men's college basketball among its Division II members in the United States and Canada for the 1991–92 basketball season.

This was the first tournament held exclusively for Division II teams; a separate tournament was held concurrently for the teams the NAIA sorted into its Division I. 

Grace defeated Northwestern (IA) in the championship game, 85–79 in overtime, to claim the Lancers' first NAIA national title.

The tournament was played at the Wisdom Gymnasium at Tarleton State University in Stephenville, Texas.

Qualification

The tournament field for the inaugural Division II championship was set at 20 teams, a decrease of 12 teams from the last single-division NAIA tournament in 1991. The top eight teams received seeds, while the eight lowest ranked teams were placed in a preliminary first round.

The tournament utilized a single-elimination format.

Bracket

See also
1992 NAIA Division I men's basketball tournament
1992 NCAA Division I men's basketball tournament
1992 NCAA Division II men's basketball tournament
1992 NCAA Division III men's basketball tournament
1992 NAIA Division II women's basketball tournament

References

NAIA
NAIA Men's Basketball Championship
1992 in sports in Texas